Péwé Peak is a bedrock peak,  high, composed of granite and topped with a dolerite sill. The peak is immediately south of Joyce Glacier and is surrounded by glacial ice except on the south side. It was named by the Advisory Committee on Antarctic Names for Troy L. Péwé, a glacial geologist with U.S. Navy Operation Deep Freeze, 1957–58, who personally explored this peak as well as adjacent portions of Victoria Land.

References

Mountains of Victoria Land
Scott Coast